The 2014 FIBA Europe Under-18 Championship was the 31st edition of the FIBA Europe Under-18 Championship. 16 teams participated in the competition, held in Konya, Turkey, from 24 July to 3 August 2014. The tournament served as the qualifying tournament for the 2015 FIBA Under-19 World Championship. Turkey also successfully defended their last year's title.

Participating teams
  (3rd place, 2013 FIBA Europe Under-18 Championship Division B)

  (Winners, 2013 FIBA Europe Under-18 Championship Division B)
  (Runners-up, 2013 FIBA Europe Under-18 Championship Division B)

First round
The first-round groups draw took place on 1 December 2013 in Freising, Germany. In the first round, the sixteen teams are allocated in four groups of four teams each. The top three teams of each group qualified for the Second Round. The last team of each group will play in the Classification Group G first, then in the 9th–16th place playoffs.

Group A

|}

Group B

|}

Group C

|}

Group D

|}

Second round
Twelve advancing teams from the First Round will be allocated in two groups of six teams each. The top four teams of each group will advance to the quarterfinals. The last two teams of each group will play in the 9th–16th place playoffs against the teams from the Group G.

Group E 

|}

Group F 

|}

Classification Group G
The last team of each group of the First Round will compete in this classification round.

|}

Classification playoffs for 9th – 16th place

Classification games for 9th – 16th place

Classification games for 9th – 12th place

Classification games for 13th – 16th place

1st – 8th place playoffs

5–8th place bracket

Quarterfinals

Semifinals

Classification games for 5th – 8th place

Final classification games

Match for 15th place

Match for 13th place

Match for 11th place

Match for 9th place

Match for 7th place

Match for 5th place

Bronze medal match

Final

Final standings

Awards 

All-Tournament Team

 Federico Mussini
 Stefan Lazarević
 Vassilis Charalampopoulos
 Dragan Bender
 Egemen Güven

References

External links
FIBA European U-18 Championship

FIBA U18 European Championship
2014–15 in European basketball
2014–15 in Turkish basketball
2014